Trichophysetis nigricincta is a moth in the family Crambidae. It is found in India (Assam) and Sri Lanka.

References

Cybalomiinae
Moths described in 1893
Moths of Asia
Moths of Sri Lanka